The Callimorphina are a subtribe of woolly bear moths in the family Erebidae. The subtribe was described by Francis Walker in 1865. Many of these moths are easily confused with butterflies, being quite brightly colored and somewhat diurnal. Their antennae are not thickened into "clubs", which is a typical characteristic of butterflies.

Taxonomy
The subtribe was previously classified as a tribe of the former family Arctiidae.

Genera
This list of genera in the subtribe were outlined by Michelle A. DaCosta and Susan J. Weller and by Vladimir Viktorovitch Dubatolov.

Aglaomorpha
Axiopoena
Callimorpha
Callindra
Calpenia
Carcinopyga
Coscinia
Cymbalophora
Dodia
Epimydia
Euleechia
Euplagia
Haploa
Kishidaria
Lacydes
Nikaea
Sebastia
Spiris
Taicallimorpha
Tinoliodes
Tyria
Utetheisa (often in Nyctemerini)

References 

 
Lepidoptera subtribes